Alpha Tucanae (α Tuc, α Tucanae) is a binary star system in the southern circumpolar constellation of Tucana. With an apparent visual magnitude of 2.86, it can be seen with the naked eye from the southern hemisphere. A cool star with a surface temperature of 4300 K, it is 424 times as luminous as the sun and 37 times its diameter. It is 2.5 to 3 times as massive. It is unclear what stage of evolution the star is in.

This is a spectroscopic binary, which means that the two stars have not been individually resolved using a telescope, but the presence of the companion has been inferred from measuring changes in the spectrum of the primary. The orbital period of the binary system is 4197.7 days (11.5 years). The primary component has a stellar classification of K3 III, which indicates it is a giant star that has exhausted the supply of hydrogen at its core and evolved away from the main sequence. It has the characteristic orange hue of a K-type star.

References 

Tucanae, Alpha
Tucana (constellation)
K-type giants
Spectroscopic binaries
110130
211416
Durchmusterung objects
8502